Royds (population 16,350 - 2001 UK census) is a ward within the City of Bradford Metropolitan District Council in the county of West Yorkshire, England. The population at the 2011 Census was 17,360.

Starting from the north end of Royds, the areas covered are Horton Bank Bottom which is shared with Great Horton Ward, then Buttershaw which makes the bulk of the ward, then a portion of the south-west side of Wibsey village. South of Halifax Road is Woodside, east of which is part of Low Moor village, the rest of which is in Wyke ward. At the south end of the ward is the more rural hamlet of Royds Hall.

Councillors 

Royds ward is represented on Bradford Council by three Labour Party councillors; Ruth Wood, Angela Tait and Andrew Thornton.

 indicates seat up for re-election.

See also
Listed buildings in Bradford (Royds Ward)

References

External links 
BBC election results
Council ward profile (pdf)

Wards of Bradford